The Candelária massacre was a mass killing in Rio de Janeiro, Brazil, on July 23, 1993. During the night, eight homeless people, including six minors, were killed by a group of men beside the Candelária Church. Several of the men were members of the police and were tried for the killings, but only two were convicted.

Background
The Candelária Church is a famous historic Roman Catholic church in central Rio de Janeiro, Brazil. The church itself and the buildings around it in Pius X Square became known as a popular location for possibly hundreds of Rio de Janeiro's street children to form a makeshift home at night. The church's personnel provides food, shelter, education and religious advice to as many of these children as possible. Many of the homeless children are involved with the illegal drug trade and prostitution, and because many of these children also live around the church during the day, police keep a constant watch on the church's surroundings. In the early 1990s, the area around the Candelária Church developed a high crime rate as street children increasingly began to commit criminal activities such as pickpocketing and robbery.

Massacre
According to survivors, on the morning of July 22, 1993, the day before the massacre, a group of children threw stones at police cars. As the children from the Candelária Church area were usually only given warnings by policemen, the young perpetrators left without worrying too much about the threat. At midnight, several Chevrolet Chevette cars with covered license plates came to a halt in front of the Candelária Church, and the occupants began shooting at the group of roughly seventy street children sleeping in the vicinity of the church.

List of those killed
Paulo Roberto de Oliveira, 11 years old
Anderson de Oliveira Pereira, 13 years old
Marcelo Cândido de Jesus, 14 years old
Valdevino Miguel de Almeida, 14 years old
"Gambazinho", 17 years old
Leandro Santos da Conceição, 17 years old
Paulo José da Silva, 18 years old
Marcos Antônio Alves da Silva, 20 years old

Aftermath
Six children and two adults were killed and numerous others were wounded outside the Candelária Church. Subsequently, during the investigations the shots were found to be fired by policemen, and fifty officers were accused of the massacre. One of them, Mauricio da Conceição, died during a shootout as he was about to be arrested in 1994. Two others, Marcos Emmanuel and Nelson Cunha, were handed sentences equivalent to life sentences.

One of the children that survived that attack was supposedly shot several times before he could testify against policemen that were to go to trial, and ended up fleeing from Brazil in order to save his life.

The international community severely condemned the attack, and many in Brazil asked for the prosecution of those who shot the Candelária Church children.

The event was addressed by the Brazilian death metal band Lacerated and Carbonized in the song "The Candelária Massacre" from their 2013 album The Core of Disruption. Blaggers ITA did the same in their 1993 single "Oxygen"

Survivors
A social worker who later tracked the fate of these homeless survivors of the Candelária massacre found out that eventually 39 of them were either killed by police or by elements of street life, and discusses this in the documentary Bus 174 about the Nascimento incident.

See also
List of massacres in Brazil

References

External links
Movie review and director interview
Amnesty International report and information
Brazilian trooper convicted of slaughtering street children, CNN.com, May 1, 1996
Trial begins for Rio police accused of killing homeless kids, CNN.com, December 9, 1996
Killing of 4 Beggars Shocks Rio And Recalls Earlier Massacre, New York Times, December 12, 1997

Police brutality in Brazil
1993 in Brazil
20th century in Rio de Janeiro
Mass murder in 1993
Massacres in 1993
July 1993 events in South America
July 1993 crimes
Mass shootings in Brazil
Massacres in Brazil
Massacres in religious buildings and structures
Street children
1993 murders in Brazil
1993 mass shootings in South America